Scene No. 7 is a 1985 Indian Malayalam-language film, directed by Ambili and produced by V. Rajan. The film stars Thilakan, Ashokan, Bharath Gopi and Shankar in the lead roles. The film has musical score by Jerry Amaldev.

Cast

Thilakan as Swami
Ashokan as Maniyan
Bharath Gopi as Menon
Shankar as Jayan, Krishnanunni (double role)
Aruna as Nandini
Sabitha Anand as Ammini
Sukumari as Thathri
Innocent as Bhaskara Menon
M. S. Warrier
Mala Aravindan as Pankan Pilla
T. G. Ravi as Sankaran
Sreenath as Sub Inspector

Soundtrack
The music was composed by Jerry Amaldev and the lyrics were written by P. Bhaskaran.

References

External links
 

1985 films
1980s Malayalam-language films
Films scored by Jerry Amaldev